The Four Letter Failure is the debut EP by the Australian band In Fiction. The EP was released in August 2006 and reached number 85 on the Australian ARIA Charts.

Track listing

Charts

References

External links
In Fiction Discography

2006 debut EPs
In Fiction albums